In human anatomy, the brachial veins are venae comitantes of the brachial artery in the arm proper.  Because they are deep to muscle, they are considered deep veins.  Their course is that of the brachial artery (in reverse): they begin where radial veins and ulnar veins join (corresponding to the bifurcation of the brachial artery).  They end at the inferior border of the teres major muscle.  At this point, the brachial veins join the basilic vein to form the axillary vein.

The brachial veins also have small tributaries that drain the muscles of the upper arm, such as biceps brachii muscle and triceps brachii muscle.

Additional Images

External links
 
 Diagram at frca.co.uk

Veins of the upper limb